Kristina Nevrkla (born 5 July 1990) is a Croatian football defender currently playing in the Croatian 1st Division for ŽNK Osijek, with whom she has also played the Champions League. She previously played for Dinamo Maksimir.

She is a member of the Croatian national team.

International goals

References

1990 births
Living people
Croatian women's footballers
Croatia women's international footballers
Women's association football defenders
ŽNK Osijek players
ŽNK Dinamo-Maksimir players